Hope Farm is a historic house in Natchez, Mississippi, USA.

History
The house was built by Carlos de Grand Pré from 1780 to 1792. Simple Spanish provincial architecture. Mary Routh Ellis sold the farm to Eli Montgomery in 1833, and for 90 years it remained in Montgomery family.

Spain and England met here. Hope Farm, charming in its simplicity, had a section built in 1775, when the English owned the Natchez area. Then, in 1790, the Spanish Governor Carlos de Grand Pré added the gallery with its ornamented, sturdy columns. The building shows a merger of two different elements of building, and of two varying cultures.

In 1926, it was purchased by J. Balfour Miller and his wife, Katherine Grafton Miller, who founded the Natchez Pilgrimage and promoted Natchez as the epitome of the Old South.

Heritage significance
The house has been listed on the National Register of Historic Places since August 22, 1975.

References

External links

Houses on the National Register of Historic Places in Mississippi
Federal architecture in Mississippi
Spanish Colonial architecture in the United States
Greek Revival houses in Mississippi
Houses completed in 1792
Houses in Adams County, Mississippi
National Register of Historic Places in Natchez, Mississippi